Theodore Kerkezos is a Greek classical saxophonist. He is “…one of the most astounding performers of the day.” Gramophone (Editor’s Choice)

Kerkezos performed and recorded the entire standard repertoire for solo saxophone with orchestras including the London Symphony, London Philharmonic Orchestra, Philharmonia (of London), St. Petersburg Philharmonic, Tchaikovsky Moscow Radio Symphony, Zurich Symphony, Boston Symphony (Pops), Vienna Chamber (Wiener Kammerorchester), Berliner Symphoniker, Reinische Philharmonie, Moscow Soloists, Athens State, "G.Enescu" Bucharest Philharmonic, Bilbao Symphony, National Radio of Romania, Erfurt Opera Philharmonic, Thuringen-Gotha Philharmonic, Meiningen Opera Symphony, Far Eastern Symphony, Massimo Belini Opera Symphony, Armenian Philharmonic, appearing at halls such as Carnegie Hall, Royal Festival Hall, Wigmore Hall, Great Hall of the “Tchaikovsky” Moscow State Conservatoire, Tonhalle-Zurich, Vienna Konzerthaus, Opera of Rome, Athens Megaron Concert Hall, Beijing Concert Hall and Herod Atticus Theatre (Athens-Parthenon).

Early life 
Kerkezos graduated from the Athens Conservatory (Babis Farantatos’ class) and continued in Paris with Daniel Deffayet and in Bordeaux with Jean-Marie Londeix.

Career 

He works with Yuri Bashmet, Vladimir Fedoseyev, Teodor Currentzis, Yuri Simonov, Myron Michailidis, and Michael Nyman.

His arrangements were performed by orchestras such as the London Philharmonic, St. Petersburg Philharmonic, Boston Pops, Berliner Symphoniker, and Wiener Kammerorchester. He was twice nominated for the US 50th Grammy Awards in New York proposed by Naxos label.

In 1999, he started a collaboration with Alphonse Leduc Editions Musicales-Paris writing books for saxophone.

Works have been dedicated to him by composers including Iannis Xenakis, Friedrich Cerha, and Mikis Theodorakis.

From 2000 - 2010 he established and was the Director of the Saxophone Orchestra of Piraeus Prefecture.

He gives master classes at Boston University, Princeton, Louisiana, Providence, Vienna State (MDW), and at the Conservatories of: Boston, New England, Moscow State, and at the Academies of: Gnesin (Moscow), Chopin (Warsaw) and Kiev. 
He plays with H. Selmer.

His discography with the London Symphony, London Philharmonic and Philharmonia has won many awards.

Recognition 

 Honorary Doctor of Musical Arts from IAACC/UNESCO, for services as performer and professor at the international music stage. 
 Honorary Member of the Academy (2012)  Russian Academy of Natural Sciences & Arts and the United Nations along with the support of the Russian Ministries of Foreign Affairs and Justice
 Artist of the Year Gina Bachauer Awards (2016)

Notable recordings
 Legende French Works For Saxophone and Orchestra, London Symphony/Yuri Simonov/Abbey Road Studios, Onyx label,4065
 Music for Saxophone and Orchestra, The Philharmonia Orchestra/martyn Brabbins-London, Naxos 8.557063
 Ballades for Saxophone and Orchestra, London Philharmonic/Roberto Minzcuk,Naxos 8.557454
 Impressions for Saxophone and Orchestra/Greek Classics, 2006, Thessaloniki State Symphony/Myron Michailides, Naxos 8.557992
 Dinos Constantinides, Three Saxophone Concertos, Nuremberg Symphony/Stefanos Tsialis, Centaur CRC 2871

Concert soloist 
 2013: 20th Century Greece: Mikis Theodorakis, Nikos Skalkottas & Manos Hadjidakis. Thessaloniki State Symphony Orchestra, Ameritz Music Ltd.
 2012: Virtuoso: Classical Music to Inspire, (various artists - Darius Milhaud’s Scaramouche for saxophone and orchestra, Philharmonia Orchestra) Naxos (Digital Compilations)
 2012: Dinos Constantinides' Works, with the Slovak National Radio Symphony and Louisiana Sinfonietta. Concerto No. 5, and Music for Bill, cond. Mario Kosik, (to be released in December 2013 by Centaur-USA Label)
 2011: My First Orchestra Album, Various artists - Darius Milhaud's Scaramouche for saxophone and orchestra - Philharmonia Orchestra. Naxos (Digital Compilations-iTunes)                                                                               * 2011: My First Classical Music Album, Various artists - Glazunov's Concerto - Philharmonia Orchestra). Naxos 8.578203
 2011: Athens Camerata, George Koumentakis’ Concerto for saxophone quartet, piano & strings with George Lazaridis (piano) and Kerkezos Saxophone Quartet at the Athens Megaron Hall. MDG Label
 2010: Nuremberg Symphony, Bertold Hummel's Works, recorded at the Meistersinger Halle for the Bayerischen Rundfunk (Bavaria Radio-Germany), cond. Marc Kissoczy.
 2010: Janacek Philharmonic of Czech Republic cond. Peter Feranec on Alkis Baltas' Monoloque.
 2009: Thessaloniki State Symphony. Manos Hadjidakis’ Mr. Knoll, for Naxos Label Radio.
 2008: Nuremberg Symphony. Darius Milhaud’s Scaramouche and Claude Debussy's Rhapsody, for the Bayerischen Rundfunk (Bavaria Radio-Germany), cond. Thomas Calb.
 1997: Athens Camerata. Thanos Mikroutsikos, For Saxophone and Strings and Love and Dreams,  cond.  Alexander Myrat, AGORA Label 130.1

References

External links
Kerkezos's personal web site
Interview by Nikos Dontas for Kathimerini in Greek.
Interview by Paris Konstantinidis for Classicalmusic.gr in Greek.

Living people
Greek saxophonists
Classical saxophonists
Year of birth missing (living people)
21st-century saxophonists